This is a list of city mayors of Katowice, Poland.

1866–1871:     Louis Diebel
1871–1873:     Oswald Kerner
1874–1889:     Otto Rüppel
1890–1903:     August Schneider
1903–1920:     Alexander Pohlmann
1922–1928:     Alfons Górnik
1928–1939:     Adam Kocur
1939–1945:     Artur Stegner
29 September 1945:     Jan Wesolowski
1945–1946:     Zenon Tomaszewski
1946–1950:     Aleksander Willner
1950–1952:     Stefan Kruzel
1952–1953:     Ewald Lison
1953–1971:     Antoni Wojda
1971–1975:     Pawel Podbial
1975–1978:     Lucjan Gajda
1978–1981:     Marian Wysocki
1981–1984:     Edward Mecha
1984–1989:     Jerzy Swierad
1989–1990:     Krystyna Nesteruk
1990–1994:     Jerzy Smialek
1994–1998:     Henryk Dziewior
1998–2014:     Piotr Uszok
2014–current   Marcin Krupa

Katowice
Mayors